Ab Bid may refer to:

Fars Province
Ab Bid, Fars, Mamasani County
Ab Bid, Doshman Ziari, Mamasani County
Ab Bid-e Dalun, Mamasani County
Ab Bid, Sepidan, Sepidan County

Hormozgan Province
 Ab Bid-e Kusha, Hormozgan Province

Khuzestan Province
 Ab Bid, Andika, Khuzestan Province
 Ab Bid-e Galleh Tavak, Andika County, Khuzestan Province
 Ab Bid, Mazu, Andimeshk County, Khuzestan Province
 Ab Bid, Qilab, Andimeshk County, Khuzestan Province
 Ab Bid, Behbahan, Khuzestan Province
 Ab Bid, Dezful, Khuzestan Province
 Ab Bid, alternate name of Abid, Dezful, Khuzestan Province
 Ab Bid Sari-ye Do, Dezful County, Khuzestan Province
 Ab Bid-e Alibaz, Gotvand County, Khuzestan Province
 Ab Bid-e Hajj Baba, Gotvand County, Khuzestan Province
 Ab Bid, Izeh, Izeh County, Khuzestan Province
 Ab Bid, Hati, Lali County, Khuzestan Province
 Ab Bid, Jastun Shah, Lali County, Khuzestan Province
 Ab Bid, Masjed Soleyman, Khuzestan Province

Kohgiluyeh and Boyer-Ahmad Province
 Ab Bid, Kohgiluyeh and Boyer-Ahmad
 Ab Bid, Boyer-Ahmad, Kohgiluyeh and Boyer-Ahmad Province
 Ab Bid-e Heygun, Kohgiluyeh and Boyer-Ahmad Province
 Ab Bid-e Mazeh Koreh, Kohgiluyeh and Boyer-Ahmad Province

Lorestan Province
 Ab Bid, Lorestan
 Ab Bid Kardakaneh, Lorestan Province